Anne Sandum (born 30 June 1973) is a Norwegian politician for the Labour Party.

She served as a deputy representative to the Parliament of Norway from Buskerud during the terms 2009–2013, 2013–2017 and 2017–2021. She hails from Ringerike.

References

1973 births
Living people
People from Ringerike (municipality)
Deputy members of the Storting
Labour Party (Norway) politicians
Buskerud politicians
Women members of the Storting
21st-century Norwegian women politicians
21st-century Norwegian politicians